Josip "Joško" Bilić (born 5 October 1974) is a Croatian retired footballer.

References

1974 births
Living people
Association football central defenders
Croatian footballers
HNK Hajduk Split players
HNK Šibenik players
Standard Liège players
Maccabi Herzliya F.C. players
Wuhan F.C. players
F.C. Ashdod players
Maccabi Netanya F.C. players
FC Red Bull Salzburg players
NK Ljubljana players
Croatian Football League players
Belgian Pro League players
Israeli Premier League players
Slovenian PrvaLiga players
Croatian expatriate footballers
Expatriate footballers in Belgium
Expatriate footballers in Israel
Expatriate footballers in China
Expatriate footballers in Austria
Expatriate footballers in Slovenia
Croatian expatriate sportspeople in Belgium
Croatian expatriate sportspeople in Israel
Croatian expatriate sportspeople in China
Croatian expatriate sportspeople in Austria
Croatian expatriate sportspeople in Slovenia